Gonbad Heq (also Romanized as Gonbad Jeq and Gonbadjoq) is a village in Quchan Atiq Rural District, in the Central District of Quchan County, Razavi Khorasan Province, Iran. At the 2006 census, its population was 336, in 85 families.

References 

Populated places in Quchan County